Iron pentahydride FeH5 is a superhydride compound of iron and hydrogen, stable under high pressures. It is important because it contains atomic hydrogen atoms that are not bonded into smaller molecular clusters, and may be a superconductor. Pairs of hydrogen atoms are not bonded together into molecules. FeH5 has been made by compressing a flake of iron with hydrogen in a diamond anvil cell to a pressure of 130 GPa and heating to below 1500K. When decompressed to 66 GPa it decomposes to solid FeH3.

The unit cell is tetragonal with space group I4/mmm.

See also
Iron hydrides

References

Hydrides
Iron compounds